This is a list of the tallest buildings in the city of Yangon. The list includes habitable buildings standing at or above  but excludes other tall structures such as the Shwedagon Pagoda in the city proper, or buildings elsewhere in the Yangon Region, such as those in Thanlyin.

Yangon has the vast majority of the tallest buildings in the country. Its tallest buildings are high rises, with the majority being condominiums. The regulations came into effect after a proposal to build a  tower in downtown Yangon was defeated by local conservationists in 2014.

Tallest buildings
Because of its use of Emporis's estimates, the list may not be fully accurate—in terms of inclusion and rankings. (Emporis estimates the height of buildings based on the number of floors; as a result, buildings with the same number of floors—regardless of the type (office or residential)—are estimated at the same height.) The estimated heights are given in italics.

Tallest under construction
The list below covers the buildings under construction that will be  or taller. The height estimates are by Emporis unless otherwise stated. The estimated heights are given in italics.

Timeline of tallest buildings
Because many of the exact building heights are not known, the timeline below may be incomplete. The estimated heights are given in italics.

See also
 List of tallest structures in Myanmar
 List of tallest buildings in Myanmar

External sources
 Committee for Quality Control of High Rise Building Construction Projects, Republic of the Union of Myanmar

Notes

References

Lists of buildings and structures in Myanmar
Architecture in Myanmar
Buildings